Tronika is a 2003 mini album by Japanese electronic duo Sketch Show; it also features remixes by Cornelius. Two tracks, "chronograph" and the Cornelius remix of "ekot", appeared in the album Loophole; "night talker", in a remixed form by Safety Scissors, was also included in Loophole. "ekot" and "chronograph" (both original and remixed versions) were released on a 12-inch vinyl single.

Track listing

External links
 

2003 EPs
Sketch Show (band) albums
Electronica EPs